Lewis Reece (born 17 June 1991) is a Welsh professional rugby league footballer who plays at  for West Wales Raiders in the Betfred Championship

Playing career
He has previously played for the South Wales Scorpions, Kingston Press Championship-1 side Gloucestershire All Golds.

International
He has played at representative level for Great Britain and Wales at Under-18's and Wales first team level.

In October 2014, Lewis was called up to the Wales national rugby league team along with 3 other players to replace the Garreth Carvell and Rob Massam withdrawals from the 2014 European Cup squad. He kicked 1 goal out of two attempts in his country's opening game against Scotland. He kicked 3 goals in the following game against France and then 1 game in the final game of the tournament against Ireland.

In October 2015, Lewis was once again called up by Welsh national team coach John Kear to play in the 2015 European Cup tournament. He appeared in all 3 of the Welsh games which included scoring a try in the final game against Ireland.

References

External links 
Whitehaven profile
Pontypridd player profile
(archived by web.archive.org) South Wales Scorpions player profile
Meet the Team – Lewis Reece
Bridgend Ravens profile
Cardiff profile
(archived by web.archive.org) Lewis Reece moves on

1991 births
Living people
Gloucestershire All Golds players
Pontypridd RFC players
Rugby league fullbacks
Rugby league players from Cardiff
Rugby union players from Cardiff
Rumney RFC players
South Wales Scorpions players
Wales national rugby league team players
Welsh rugby league players
Welsh rugby union players
Whitehaven R.L.F.C. players